Tartar sauce (spelled tartare sauce in the UK, Ireland, New Zealand, Australia, Fiji, South Africa) is a condiment made of mayonnaise, chopped pickles and relish, capers, and herbs such as tarragon and dill. Tartar sauce can also be enhanced with the addition of other varieties of herbs, lemon juice, or olives. It is most often served with seafood dishes such as fish and chips, fish sandwiches, fish fingers, fried oysters, and calamari.

Composition
Tartar sauce is based on either mayonnaise (egg yolk, mustard or vinegar, bitartrate, oil) or aioli (olive oil, garlic), with certain other ingredients added. In the UK, recipes typically add to the base capers, gherkins, lemon juice, and dill. US recipes may include chopped dill pickles, onions (or chives), and fresh parsley. Chopped hard-boiled eggs or olives are sometimes added, as may be Dijon mustard and cocktail onions.

See also

 List of dips
 Remoulade
 Steak tartare
 Tarator
 Sauce gribiche

References

External links
 An explanation of the name's origin, from The Straight Dope
 A definition at Allrecipes.com

Sauces
Mayonnaise
Tatar cuisine
French cuisine